The Veneția is a left tributary of the river Olt in Romania. It flows into the Olt near Veneția de Jos. Its name is spelled like the Romanian exonym for Venice, but they are etymologically unrelated.

References

Rivers of Romania
Rivers of Brașov County